Yi Baidi (born 10 October 1993 in Shenzhen) is a Chinese footballer who plays for Jiangsu Yancheng Dingli in the China League Two.

Club career
Yi Baidi joined Hangzhou Greentown youth team system from Shenzhen Yantian Sports School. He started his professional football career in 2011 when he was loaned to Wenzhou Provenza's squad for the 2011 China League Two campaign. Yi was promoted to Hangzhou Greentown first team squad in 2013. On 22 May 2013, he made his debut for Hangzhou in the third round of 2013 Chinese FA Cup against amateur team Wuhan Hongxin in a 1–0 home victory. He scored his first goal on 15 July 2014, in the third round of 2014 Chinese FA Cup against Beijing BIT. On 5 October 2014, Yi made his Super League debut in a 4–0 away defeat against Guangzhou Evergrande, coming on as a substitute for Zang Yifeng in the 75th minute.

Career statistics 
Statistics accurate as of match played 12 October 2019.

References

1993 births
Living people
Sportspeople from Shenzhen
Zhejiang Professional F.C. players
Chinese Super League players
Chinese footballers
Association football midfielders